Euthria calypso is a species of sea snail, a marine gastropod mollusk in the family Buccinidae, the true whelks.

Description
The size of an adult shell varies between 35 mm and 48 mm.

Distribution
This species occurs in the Atlantic Ocean along the Cape Verdes.

References

 Rolán E., 2005. Malacological Fauna From The Cape Verde Archipelago. Part 1, Polyplacophora and Gastropoda
 Fraussen K. & Swinnen F. (2016). A review of the genus Euthria Gray, 1839 (Gastropoda: Buccinidae) from the Cape Verde archipelago. Xenophora Taxonomy. 11: 9–31

External links
 

Buccinidae
Gastropods described in 1983
Gastropods of Cape Verde